Christopher Convery (born January 15, 2008) is an American actor. He starred as Jude in Brahms: The Boy II.  He also starred in Sony’s The Girl in the Spider's Web (2018).  He stars in the Netflix series On the Verge in the role of Albert.

Personal life and career

Convery was born in Las Vegas, Nevada. His family moved to New York City when he was seven years old after he landed a principal role on Broadway in Kinky Boots starring opposite Billy Porter. They lived in New York City for five years where Christopher starred in multiple films and television series. Later, they moved to Los Angeles and currently reside there. He is the cousin of actor Christian Convery.

He attends the Professional Performing Arts School in New York City. He is also a singer and a pianist. He has performed at 54 Below, Birdland and The Green Room in New York City.

His acting roles include Young Billy in the Netflix series Stranger Things (2019), a recurring role as Martin in Fox's TV series Gotham (2017–18)  and appearances in other hit TV series such as MacGyver (2020), Chicago Med (2019), Succession (2018), The Blacklist: Redemption (2017), and Haters Back Off (2017). He also appeared in the 2022 drama film Prisoner's Daughter.

Convery began his professional acting career at the age of seven on Broadway in the role of Young Charlie in Kinky Boots (2013), directed by Jerry Mitchell.

Filmography

References

External links

Living people
21st-century American male actors
American male child actors
2008 births